The Närke-Värmland Regiment was a Swedish Army infantry regiment that traced its origins back to the 16th century. It was split into two new regiments in 1812. The regiment's soldiers were recruited from the provinces of Närke and Värmland.

History 
The regiment has its origins in fänikor (companies) raised in Närke and Värmland in the 16th century. In 1614, these units—along with fänikor from the nearby province of Södermanland—were organised by Gustav II Adolph into Södermanlands storregemente, of which eleven of the total 24 companies were recruited in Värmland and five in Närke. Södermanlands storregemente consisted of three field regiments, of which Närke Regiment and Värmland Regiment were two. Sometime around 1624, the grand regiment was permanently split into three smaller regiments, of which Närke Regiment and Värmland Regiment were two. In 1629, these two regiments were merged to form Närke-Värmland Regiment.

The Närke-Värmland Regiment was one of the original 20 Swedish infantry regiments mentioned in the Swedish constitution of 1634. The regiment's first commander was the Scot Alexander Leslie. It was allotted in 1686 (Närke) and 1688 (Värmland). The regiment was split in 1812 into the two original regiments, Närke Regiment and Värmland Regiment.

Campaigns 
The Polish War (1600–1629)
The Thirty Years' War (1630–1648)
The Northern Wars (1655–1661)
The Scanian War (1674–1679)
The Great Northern War (1700–1721)
The Hats' Russian War (1741–1743)
The Seven Years' War (1757–1762)
The Gustav III's Russian War (1788–1790)
The Franco-Swedish War (1805–1810)
The Finnish War (1808–1809)

Organisation 
–1812
Livkompaniet
Överstelöjtnantens kompani
Majorens kompani
Örebro kompani
Kristinehamns kompani
Jösse härads kompani
Älvdals kompani
Näs kompani
Karlstads kompani
Nordmarks kompani

Name, designation and garrison

See also 
List of Swedish regiments

Footnotes

References

Print

Online

Infantry regiments of the Swedish Army
Military units and formations established in 1624
Military units and formations established in 1812
Disbanded units and formations of Sweden